The 2006 All-Ireland Minor Camogie Championship is a competition for age graded development squad county teams in the women's team field sport of camogie was won by Kilkenny, who defeated Galway by 11 points in the final, played at Nenagh.

Arrangements
Until 2005 the term minor was applied to the Al-Ireland under-16 camogie championship. W report in 2004 on the state of the game recommended bthat a minor under-18 championship, similar to other Gaelic game be introduced. A cup for the new competition was named for Síghle Nic an Ultaigh. Galway raced into a four-point lead against Cork in the semi-final at Glen Rovers’ grounds as Jessica Gill and Noreen Coen caused problems for the Cork defence and ran out winnersby 2–12 to 1–5. Michelle Quilty scored 3–2  as Kilkenny defeated Tipperary in the semi-final at Holycross. Laura Kavanagh scored two goals for Kilkenny.

The Final
Kilkenny made several positional switches for the final against Galway at Nenagh. Sinéad Walsh, Leanne Fennelly and Kate McDonald excelled in defence; Colette Dormer, Anne Dalton and Lucinda Gahan impressed in the middle of the field; and all the forwards scored.

B Division
The Minor B final was won by Down who defeated Antrim by a single point in a dramatic final, 5-8 to 6-4. Down led 2–2 to 1–4 at half time. Derry had three goals in the first four minutes of the second-half, then Antrim rallied and closed the gap to one point with ten minutes remaining. Raquel McCarry and Sara Louise Carr swapped spectacular goals toward the end.

Final stages

References

External links
 Camogie Association

Minor
All-Ireland Minor Camogie Championship